The 2nd Grey Cup was played on November 26, 1910, before 12,000 fans at A.A.A. Grounds at Hamilton.

The University of Toronto Varsity Blues defeated the Hamilton Tigers 16–7.

Game summary
U. of Toronto Varsity Blues (16) - TDs, Red Dixon, Jack Maynard; cons., Maynard; singles, Hugh Gall (2), Dixon (2), Maynard.

Hamilton Tigers (7) - FG, Kid Smith; singles, Ben Simpson (3), Smith.

Toronto Varsity Blues roster

Management

 President: G.A. Kingston
 Manager: J.B. McDonald
 Head Coach: Harry Griffith

Players

 H.G. Kennedy
 Lew Cory
 Bob Thompson
 Frank Park
 Pete German
 Bob Grass
 Jack Maynar
 P. Gardner
 Ewart "Reddy" Dixon
 Jack Lajoie
 Elloit Greene
 E. Murray Thomson
 Stan Clark
 H.M. Dawson
 Jim Bell
 A.V. Leonard
 Charlie Gage
 J.L. Carroll

External links
 
 

02
Grey Cup
Grey Cup, 02nd
1910 in Ontario
November 1910 sports events
20th century in Hamilton, Ontario
Toronto Varsity Blues football